El Señor de los Cielos (in English: Lord of the Skies) is an American telenovela created by Luis Zelkowicz, based on an original idea by Mariano Calasso, and Andrés López and it started airing on American broadcast channel Telemundo. Produced by Argos Comunicación and Telemundo Studios, and Caracol Internacional in the first season, and distributed by Telemundo Internacional.  The series is based on the life and work of Amado Carrillo Fuentes, the former leader of the Juarez Cartel. It stars Rafael Amaya as the titular character, Aurelio Casillas.

The series has won several awards including; International Emmy Award for Non-English Language Us Primetime Program. Premios Tu Mundo for Novela or serie of the Year for three consecutive years.

On 15 February 2022, Telemundo announced that the series had been renewed for an eighth season that premiered on 17 January 2023.

Synopsis

The series follows the life of Aurelio Casillas (Rafael Amaya), a drug lord who is recognized for knowing how to transfer drug substances to Mexico, Colombia, and the United States. Aurelio and his wife Ximena (Ximena Herrera) have three children, Rutila (Carmen Aub), Heriberto (Ruy Senderos), and Luz Marina (Gala Montes). He also has his faithful brother Chacorta (Raúl Méndez) who helps him in all his illicit businesses. Aurelio ends up being cornered by the authorities after being found as he decides to undergo a face operation in which he supposedly dies, thus causing his empire of power to fall.

In season two, believed to be dead, Aurelio returns to enact his revenge on police officer Leonor Ballesteros (Carmen Villalobos), who through her fault ends up operating his face in a failed attempt to escape from the authorities. Aurelio meets Victoria Navárez (Marlene Favela), a beautiful woman who throws herself to be the governor of Jalisco. Aurelio, after seeing her actions, falls in love and decides to deceive her by posing as another man and usurping the identity of Danilo Ferro. A character that is then introduced is José María "Chema" Venegas (Mauricio Ochmann), one of the great enemies of Aurelio who decides to take all its power to Aurelio. At the end of the season, Leonor captures Aurelio and lasts several months in prison naval bunker.

In season three, after several months imprisoned in naval bunker in Mexico, Aurelio receives the mutilated head of his brother Chacorta in a box, implying that his brother has died, who gives him reason to wage a war against all his enemies and to look for the murderer of his brother, to avenge his death. After all the problems with the government and the DEA, Aurelio learns that he suffers from kidney failure and decides to remember his past in order to find his lost son.

In season four, Aurelio after being cornered by his illness and not finding no relative who lives with him can donate a kidney, decides to undertake a search for all the lovers he had in order to find a lost son who can donate a kidney. After several attempts of searching, Aurelio finds a young man named Ismael (Iván Arana), who can be his salvation. His enemies, after learning of his illness, decide to do everything possible to get Ismael out of the way. When everything seems to take its course and achieve total stability in the world of legal and illegal businesses of Aurelio, Emiliana Contreras (Vanessa Villela) appears a beautiful woman sent by Feyo Aguilera (Leonardo Daniel) to be able to make Aurelio fall, but her mission is to become the lover Of Aurelio to thus be able to finally make the fall of Aurelio's empire.

In season five, Aurelio, will unleash a new war, but this time it will not be against his former rivals and enemies – this time, it will be against his own family because of the betrayals he had previously experienced on their part. Later, Aurelio (Rafael Amaya), will also face a serious illness, which puts at stake his power and prestige since this man fails to get a donor, so they can make his transplant, necessary to continue living. On the other hand, Mónica (Fernanda Castillo) fights for her life after being rescued from Víctor's hands in the middle of their wedding, since while she fled received a shot that apparently is mortal; After being taken from his side, Víctor (Jorge Luis Moreno) searches everywhere to find Mónica's whereabouts and continue with her wedding plans.

In season six, Aurelio Casillas recovered all the lost fortune and finally feels the need to retire. But it is time for retribution, the hatred that he sowed since he sold his soul to the drug trafficking demon is now knocking on his door with the face and blood of the many innocent people he destroyed. Aurelio will understand that his riches are an illusion, and that after being the great hunter he was, he will now become the prey. The women he mistreated, the men he betrayed, the political puppets he put in power, and even his own children will turn against him.

In season seven, to avoid falling into the hands of the American justice, Amado Leal "El Águila Azul", now Amado Casillas (Matías Novoa), has turned himself in to Bernardo Castillo (José Sedek), Secretary of Security of Mexico. The DEA commissioner, Joe Navarro (Guy Ecker), has made every attempt to achieve his extradition. What he does not know is that Baltazar Ojeda (Eduardo Santamarina), a CIA agent, has the plan to eliminate Amado before, since he is the only one who can prove that within the organization in which both worked together, there is a scheme of corruption and murky management that endangers its existence within it and its freedom. He has already been transferred to a jail on the outskirts of the State of Mexico and is about to be taken to the airport, under strict security measures when the Casillas cartel tries to rescue him and Baltazar Ojeda himself tries to kill him. In the midst of this tension and in parallel, under the supervision of Doña Alba (Lisa Owen) and a specialized doctor, they try a risky procedure to revive Aurelio (Rafael Amaya).

Season eight centers on the return of Aurelio Casillas, who supposedly died at the beginning of the previous season after falling into a coma following an attempt on his life. It is only the DEA who knows that Aurelio is alive, having hidden him in the desert. In enacting his plan of revenge, Aurelio establishes connections with old allies, while also facing new romances and uncovering family mysteries.

Cast and characters 

 Rafael Amaya as Aurelio Casillas (seasons 1–6, 8; guest season 7; guest appearance in El Chema), the main protagonist of the series and also made a guest appearance in El Chema
 Ximena Herrera as Ximena Letrán (seasons 1–2)
 Robinson Díaz as Miltón Jiménez / Pío José Valdivia "El Cabo" (season 1, 6–7; recurring season 2, 8; special guest star season 5)
 Raúl Méndez as Víctor Casillas "Chacorta" (seasons 1–3)
 Carmen Villalobos as Leonor Ballesteros Mirelis (seasons 1–3)
 Gabriel Porras as Marco Cartagena Mejía (season 1)
 Mauricio Ochmann as José María Venegas Mendivil "El Chema" (seasons 2–3; special guest stars season 1; the main protagonist in the spin-off series of El Chema)
Alberto Guerra as José María Venegas Mendivil "El Chema" (season 6; recurring season 7)
 Fernanda Castillo as Mónica Robles Urdieta (seasons 2–5; recurring season 1; she also made a guest appearance in the spin-off series of El Chema)
 Marlene Favela as Victoria Navárez "La Gober" (season 2)
 Carmen Aub as Rutila Casillas Letrán (seasons 3–8; recurring season 2; guest appearance in the spin-off series of El Chema)
 Terina Angell as Child Rutila (season 1)
 Ana Sofía Durán as Child Rutila (season 2)
 Maritza Rodríguez as Amparo Rojas (seasons 3–4)
 Sabrina Seara as Esperanza Salvatierra Cortini (seasons 4–5, recurring season 3)
 Vanessa Villela as Emiliana Contreras Cortenas (seasons 4–5; guest appearance in the spin-off series of El Chema)
 Marisela González as Eunice Lara "La Felina" (season 5; recurring seasons 4, 8; main role in Season 2 of La Doña)
 Miguel Varoni as Leandro Quezada (season 5–6)
 Guy Ecker as Joe Navarro (seasons 6–7)
 Ninel Conde as María de los Ángeles "Evelina" López (seasons 6–7)
 Carlos Bardem as Don Leonidas "Chivo" Ahumada (season 6), Former Candidate for the Governor of Coahuila.
 Alejandro López Silva as El Súper Javi (season 6, 8; recurring seasons 3–5, 7; guest appearance in the spin-off series of El Chema)
 Francisco Gattorno as Gustavo Casasola (season 6)
 Jesús Moré as Omar Terán Robles (season 6; recurring seasons 3–5; guest appearance in the spin-off series of El Chema)
 Lisa Owen as Doña Alba Casillas (season 6; recurring seasons 1–3, 5, 7–8)
 Isabella Castillo as Diana Ahumada (season 6–8)
 María Conchita Alonso as Nora Requena (season 6)
 Matías Novoa as Amado Casillas Leal "El Águila Azul" (season 6–7)
 Iván Arana as Ismael Casillas Guerra (season 6–8; recurring seasons 4–5; guest appearance in the spin-off series of El Chema)
 Héctor Bonilla as Arturo López "El Rayo" (season 6)
 Roberto Escobar as José Ramiro Valdés (season 6; recurring season 7)
 Eduardo Santamarina as Balthazar Ojeda (season 7; recurring season 6)
 Danna García as Violeta Estrella (season 7)
 Rubén Cortada as Fernando Aguirre (season 8)
 África Zavala as Mecha de la Cruz (season 8)
 Yuri Vargas as Tracy Lobo (season 8)
 Marisela Berti as Edith Guzman

Crossovers
El Señor de los Cielos is known for taking place in the same universe as other famous narconovelas like El Chema (a spin-off of El Señor de los Cielos), Señora Acero, Queen of the South (the English adaptation of La Reina del Sur), Pablo Escobar: El Patrón del Mal, Dueños del Paraíso and La Doña. In the season 1 of El Señor de los Cielos, Pablo Escobar (Andrés Parra) from Pablo Escobar: El Patrón del Mal appears as a recurring character. In Señora Acero, Aurelio Casillas (Rafael Amaya), the protagonist of El Señor de los Cielos appeared in three episodes, two of the first season and one in the second season. Aurelio also appears in the English adaptation of La Reina del Sur, entitled Queen of the South in which Aurelio Casillas is a big rival to Teresa Mendoza (Alice Braga), the main protagonist of  Queen of the South and the head of Mendoza Cartel. Later Aurelio appeared in the sequel of the series El Señor de los Cielos, titled El Chema, the character appears in few episodes of the series.
In the fifth season of El Señor de los Cielos, there is a crossover with Dueños del Paraíso when the main villain of Dueños del Paraiso, Leandro Quezada (Miguel Varoni), the head of Santa Norma Cartel (or Cartel de Santa Norma) goes to war against Aurelio Casillas for the control of drug trafficking and becomes the fiercest opponent that Aurelio Casillas has ever faced. In the sixth season of El Señor de los Cielos, there is a crossover with La Doña when the protagonist and main character of La Doña, Altagracia Sandoval or La Doña (Aracely Arámbula) becomes an unexpected ally of the main character and protagonist of El Señor de los Cielos, Aurelio Casillas or Señor de los Cielos (Rafael Amaya) after returning to Mexico after fleeing to France after the events in La Doña. Another crossover between El Señor de los Cielos and La Doña occurs in the second season when the characters Eunice Lara "La Felina" (Maricela González), and Amado Casillas "El Águila Azul" (Matías Novoa), two of the main characters  of El Señor de los Cielos become recurring characters in La Doña

Related media 
During the broadcast of the second season, Telemundo published a comic based on the second season of the series, portraying part of the plot of the series. In September 2014, the character played by Rafael Amaya, appeared in the series Señora Acero in the first two episodes of the series as a special guest, in November 2015 returned to have a special participation in the series in an episode with Ana Lucia Dominguez. The character of Aurelio has appeared twice in the adaptation of La Reina del Sur, titled Queen of the South.

Spin-off
Telemundo confirmed on May 15, 2016, that the series would see a Spin-off based upon actor Mauricio Ochmann's character "El Chema". El Chema'' premiered on December 6, 2016.

Opening theme 
All songs in the series are composed by Marco Flores and performed by Cardenales de Nuevo León. In the first season the main theme was "El jefe de todos". For the second season, the opening theme song was changed to "El verdadero Jefe de todos". In the third season the song was composed around the main character of the series and is titled "Aurelio Casillas". In the fourth season, the song of the main theme was changed to "El cuarto corrido". In the fifth season the opening theme titled "El quinto corrido", this time performed by Don Chayo, member of the band Cardenales de Nuevo León. In the eighth season the opening theme is titled "Hierba mala nunca muere", performed by Los Tucanes de Tijuana.

Ratings 
 

| link6            = List of El Señor de los Cielos episodes#Season 6 (2018)
| episodes6        = 99
| start6           = 
| startrating6     = 2.14
| end6             = 
| endrating6       = 2.06
| viewers6         = |2}} 

| link7            = List of El Señor de los Cielos episodes#Season 7 (2019)
| episodes7        = 75
| start7           = 
| startrating7     = 1.99
| end7             = 
| endrating7       = 1.32
| viewers7         = |2}} 

| link8            = List of El Señor de los Cielos episodes#Season 8 (2023)
| episodes8        = 42
| start8           = 
| startrating8     = 1.62
| end8             = 
| endrating8       = 
| viewers8         = |2}} 
}}

Notes

Awards and nominations

References

External links
 

 
2013 American television series debuts
2013 Mexican television series debuts
Films about Mexican drug cartels
American television series based on telenovelas
Telemundo telenovelas
Mexican telenovelas
Spanish-language American telenovelas
2013 telenovelas
2014 telenovelas
2015 telenovelas
2016 telenovelas
Argos Comunicación telenovelas
2010s American LGBT-related drama television series
2017 telenovelas
American telenovelas
Mexican LGBT-related television shows
Spanish-language television shows
2018 telenovelas
2019 telenovelas
Television series about organized crime
Works about Mexican drug cartels
2020 American television series endings
2020 Mexican television series endings